Waking a Sleepwalker is the third studio album released by Scottish singer-songwriter Tommy Reilly. The album was funded by fans through PledgeMusic. It was released to Pledge on 24 July 2013 and subsequently released on other platforms on 29 September 2013.

Track listing
All songs written by Tommy Reilly.

 "Dominoes or Darts"
 "6 Billion People"
 "The Train Rolls On (If I Find It)"
 "Shook My Blues Out" 
 "She's His"
 "I Don't Really Know You"
 "Test the Water"
 "Shut My Eyes"
 "Spot of Trouble"
 "Crocodiles"

References

2013 albums
Tommy Reilly (Scottish musician) albums